Trémolat is a commune in the Dordogne department in Nouvelle-Aquitaine in southwestern France.

Geography
Trémolat station has rail connections to Bordeaux, Bergerac and Sarlat-la-Canéda.

Population

Media
The director Claude Chabrol filmed Le Boucher (1970) in Trémolat.

See also
Communes of the Dordogne department

References

Communes of Dordogne